Luca Ivanković (born 26 September 1987 in Split, SFR Yugoslavia) is a Croatian female basketball player who plays as center. At the 2012 Summer Olympics, she competed for the Croatia women's national basketball team in the women's event. She is 198 cm tall.

References

External links
Profile at eurobasket.com

1987 births
Living people
Basketball players from Split, Croatia
Croatian women's basketball players
Centers (basketball)
Olympic basketball players of Croatia
Basketball players at the 2012 Summer Olympics
ŽKK Novi Zagreb players
ŽKK Šibenik players
Beşiktaş women's basketball players
Croatian Women's Basketball League players
Mediterranean Games bronze medalists for Croatia
Competitors at the 2009 Mediterranean Games
Mediterranean Games medalists in basketball